Mae Winters Kernaghan (April 23, 1901 – September 1980) was an American politician from Pennsylvania who served as a Republican member of the Pennsylvania House of Representatives for Delaware County from 1957 to 1966 and for the 163rd district from 1967 to 1970.

Biography
Kernaghan was born in Philadelphia, Pennsylvania.  She worked as secretary and public relations director for the Salvation Army Maintenance Campaign Office in Delaware County.  She was treasurer and president of the Yeadon Public Library.

She was elected to the Pennsylvania House of Representatives for Delaware County in 1956 and served 6 consecutive terms.  She was not a candidate for reelection in 1970.

She died in Lansdowne, Pennsylvania.

References

Republican Party members of the Pennsylvania House of Representatives
Women state legislators in Pennsylvania
1901 births
1980 deaths
20th-century American politicians
20th-century American women politicians